Jack E. Robinson was a professional rugby league footballer who played in the 1910s. After touring Australasia with Great Britain, Robinson joined the Great War, and was badly wounded at the Battle of Neuve Chapelle in March 1915.

Playing career

International honours
Jack Robinson won caps for Great Britain while at Rochdale Hornets in 1914 against Australia (2 matches).

County Cup Final appearances
Jack Robinson played right-, i.e. number 3, in Rochdale Hornets' 12–5 victory over Oldham in the 1911–12 Lancashire County Cup Final during the 1911–12 season at Wheater's Field, Broughton, Salford on Saturday 2 December 1911, in front of a crowd of 20,000.

References

External links
!Great Britain Statistics at englandrl.co.uk (statistics currently missing due to not having appeared for both Great Britain, and England)

British Army personnel of World War I
English rugby league players
Great Britain national rugby league team players
Place of birth missing
Place of death missing
Rochdale Hornets players
Rugby league wingers
Year of birth missing
Year of death missing